Cycasia is a genus of tephritid  or fruit flies in the family Tephritidae.  It is considered a synonym of Ornithoschema.

References

Trypetinae